Greens Cut is an unincorporated community in Burke County, in the U.S. state of Georgia.

History
A post office called Greens Cut was established in 1854, and remained in operation until 1926. The community took its name from a nearby railway cut, which in turn bears the name of Moses P. Green, original owner of the site.

References

Railway cuts in the United States
Unincorporated communities in Burke County, Georgia
Unincorporated communities in Georgia (U.S. state)